Neman Mosty is a Belarusian football club based in Mosty, Grodno Region.

History
The team was founded in 1986. Until 1991 they played in Belarusian SSR league. In 1992, they joined newly created Belarusian Second League. From 1999 till 2003 they played in the First League, until the relegation. Since 2004, they are playing in the Second League again. In 2014, the team was eligible for promotion to the First League, but declined due to low financing. Since 2015 the club is playing in regional Grodno Oblast league.

References

Football clubs in Belarus
Grodno Region
1986 establishments in Belarus
Association football clubs established in 1986